Alasdair Gray (1934–2019) wrote novels, short stories, poetry and drama.

Novels
Lanark (1981) 
1982, Janine (1984) 
The Fall of Kelvin Walker (1985)
Something Leather (1990) 
McGrotty and Ludmilla (1990) 
Poor Things (1992) 
A History Maker (1994)
Mavis Belfrage (1996) 
Old Men In Love (2007)

Short stories
Unlikely Stories, Mostly (1983) 
Lean Tales (1985) (with James Kelman and Agnes Owens) (1995) 
Ten Tales Tall & True (1993)

Poetry
Old Negatives (1989) 
Sixteen Occasional Poems (2000)
Collected Verse (2010) 
Guts Minced with Oatmeal: Ten Late poems (2018)

Translations
Hell: Dante's Divine Trilogy Part One, Decorated and Englished in Prosaic Verse (2018) 
Purgatory: Dante's Divine Trilogy Part Two, Englished in Prosaic Verse (2019) 
Paradise: Dante's Divine Trilogy Part Three, Englished in Prosaic Verse (2020)

Theatre
Dialogue - A Duet (1971)
The Loss of the Golden Silence(1973)
Homeward Bound: A Trio for Female Chauvinists (1973)
Sam Lang and Miss Watson: A One Act Sexual Comedy In Four Scenes (1973)
McGrotty and Ludmilla (1986)
Working Legs: A Play for Those Without Them (1997)
Goodbye Jimmy (2006)
Midgieburgers (2007)
A Gray Play Book (2009) 
Fleck (2011)

Television
Martin (1971)
Dialogue - A Duet (1972)
Today and Yesterday (1975)
Beloved (1976)

Radio
Quiet People (1968)
Dialogue: A Duet (1969)
The Trial of Thomas Muir (1970)
The Loss of the Golden Silence (1973)
McGrotty and Ludmilla (1975)

As illustrator
100 Songs of Scotland (Author, Wilma Patterson) (1996))

Non-fiction
Why Scots Should Rule Scotland (1992; revised 1997)
The Book of Prefaces (ed.) (2000) 
A Short Survey of Classic Scottish Writing (2001),
How We Should Rule Ourselves (2005) (with Adam Tomkins)

Of Me & Others: An Autobiography (Cargo Publishing.) (2014)

Other appearances

Music
Cindytalk Wappinschaw (Touched Recordings, 1994) - Gray appears on "Wheesht" reading from Book 2 of Lanark
Future Pilot AKA Secrets From The Clockhouse (Creeping Bent, 2006) – Gray performs on "Equations of Love"
LAN Formatique The Sadness of Distances (Signifier, 2012) - Gray reads from the poems "Mind the Gap" and "1st of March, 1990", and in "The Stars Are But Thistles" reads from the poem "Dictators".

Film
Under the Helmet was a 1964 BBC film about the career of Alasdair Gray.

Anthologies
(Contributor) Pax Edina: The One O' Clock Gun Anthology (Edinburgh, 2010)
(Contributor) "Elsewhere: Here" (Cargo Publishing/McSweeney's, 2012) 
(Contributor) Beacons: Stories for Our Not So Distant Future (Oneworld Publications, 2013)

Books about Gray

Academic
The Arts of Alasdair Gray, Robert Crawford and Thom Nairn (1991) 
Alasdair Gray, Stephen Bernstein (1999) 
Alasdair Gray: A Unique Scottish Magus, Joy Hendry (ed.) (2000) 
Alasdair Gray: Critical Appreciations and a Bibliography, Phil Moores (ed.) (2001; includes contributions by Gray.) 
Postmodern Strategies in Alasdair Gray's Lanark: A Life in Four Books, Luis de Juan (2003) 
Shades of Gray: Science Fiction, History and the Problem of Postmodernism in the Work of Alasdair Gray, Dietmar Böhnke (2004) 
Alasdair Gray: The Fiction of Communion, Gavin Miller (2005) 
Voices from Modern Scotland: Janice Galloway, Alasdair Gray, Bernard Sellin (coord.) (2007) 
Alasdair Gray: Ink for Worlds, Camille Manfredi (ed.) (2014; includes contributions by Gray.)

Biographical
Alasdair Gray: A Secretary's Biography, Rodge Glass (2008) 
A Life in Pictures (2010) (illustrated autobiography)

References

Novels by Alasdair Gray